Bogdan Burlă (born 5 June 1996) is a Romanian footballer who plays as a centre back for Crișul Chișineu-Criș. In his career Burlă played more than 130 matches for UTA Arad, team with which he achieved two promotions, to Liga III and to Liga II.

References

External links
 

1996 births
Living people
Sportspeople from Arad, Romania
Romanian footballers
Association football defenders
CA Osasuna players
Liga II players
FC UTA Arad players
Liga III players
Romanian expatriate footballers
Romanian expatriate sportspeople in Spain
Expatriate footballers in Spain